Farr West is a city on the northern edge of Weber County, Utah. The population was 5,928 at the time of the 2010 census. It is part of the Ogden–Clearfield metropolitan area. The mayor as of 2022 is Ken Phippen.

Geography
According to the United States Census Bureau, the city has a total area of 5.8 square miles (15.1 km2), all land.

Farr West is bordered by Plain City to the west, Willard to the north, Pleasant View to the northeast, Harrisville to the east, and Marriott-Slaterville to the south.

History 
In 1858, Joseph Taylor settled in the area that later became Farr West. In 1868, the area was included as a part of Harrisville when a precinct was organized. On November 30, 1890, western Harrisville was organized into a separate LDS ward and given the name Farr West in honor of Lorin Farr, former president of the Weber LDS stake, and Chauncey W. West, who had served as presiding bishop of Weber County, and who was the son-in-law of Abraham Hoagland. The name echoes "Far West", an important early Mormon settlement in frontier Missouri. 

The earliest settlers engaged in agriculture for their livelihood, and it received a great boost when the sugar beet industry was introduced in 1898. In 1923, further benefits were available to farmers when the Utah Packing Corporation installed a pea viner to help process field-grown peas.

Early settlers raised hay and grain and kept a few farm animals for work and food. As the population grew, some farmers furnished milk and butter to customers in the city. Later, farmers branched into dairy or poultry operations to augment family income; a few raised cash crops like onions, tomatoes, and potatoes. Since World War II, most local small farms have gone out of business, and only a few large farms specializing in dairy or beef production remain in operation. In the early 1990s, only one farm raised garden fruits and vegetables commercially. Irrigation for farming is still obtained through the western Irrigation Company Canal, constructed in 1858 and enlarged in 1884. The Willard Bay Canal, constructed through Farr West in 1965, may, in time, serve part of the community.

The first frame school building in western Harrisville was built in 1872. It was replaced in 1880 with a new red brick schoolhouse. In 1914 a yellow brick school building was erected in the center of town. Through the consolidation of area schools, this building was taken out of service in 1938. In 1941 the Walquist Elementary School began serving the public, and in 1950 was converted into a junior high school. In 2014, Wahlquist Junior High was rebuilt and moved to another location in Farr West. The new Farr West Elementary School began operation in the northwestern part of the community in 1983. There is now an elementary in the northern part of Farr West named Silver Ridge Elementary, which was erected in 2020.

The first LDS church building was completed in 1891, serving as the center of church and community activities for fifty-three years until it was destroyed by fire in 1944. Other LDS chapels were constructed in 1926 and 1981.

In 1900, the first post office was established in Farr West. Rural free mail delivery began in 1905. Also, in 1905, phone service was brought into the community. Electricity was made available on May 29, 1916. The Farr West Sewer Improvement District was established on January 4, 1968. Natural gas was brought into the community in August 1958. Bona Vista Water Improvement District provided culinary water in 1958; Pine View Water Systems brought a secondary water system to the area in 1982.

The earliest business in Farr West was built in 1862. It was called the Prairie House and was a tavern that primarily served travelers on their way to the gold mines in Montana. In 1869 the Union Pacific Railroad laid a line through the eastern part of Farr West, a line later called the Ogden Shoreline. In 1874, William Rawson opened the first general merchandise store in the town. For many years, new businesses remained in operation for a relatively short time. Only in recent years have more permanent business activities become established. At the end of 1992, the city had issued licenses to sixty-one businesses, which range in size from the large Smith and Edwards variety store to small businesses operating from home sites.

The earliest unimproved roads were dusty in dry weather and filled with ruts, and difficult to traverse in bad weather. Applying gravel to the roads improved their condition markedly, but asphalt and concrete were not used on local roads until around 1930 (the year West Harrisville Road was paved).

Before incorporating, the community elected a town planning committee in 1962 and then elected a town committee in 1972. These groups worked with the Weber County Planning Commission to effect a desirable growth pattern in the community. However, town residents became increasingly fearful that they would lose the ability to effectively convey their desires to the county planners. The concern eventually led to the incorporation of Farr West City in 1980. Becoming the twelfth city in Weber County, it began formal operation on January 1, 1981. Jimmie Papageorge was elected as the first mayor. City officials operated out of their homes until city offices were constructed. The first meeting was held in the new town hall on November 4, 1982.

Demographics

As of the census of 2000, there were 3,094 people, 1,034 households, and 822 families residing in the city. The population density was 530.0 people per square mile (204.6/km2). There were 1,088 housing units at an average density of 186.4 per square mile (71.9/km2). The racial makeup of the city was 97.09% White, 0.23% African American, 0.39% Native American, 0.58% Asian, 0.87% from other races, and 0.84% from two or more races. Hispanic or Latino of any race were 2.78% of the population.

There were 1,034 households, out of which 40.3% had children under 18 living with them, 70.3% were married couples living together, 6.7% had a female householder with no husband present, and 20.5% were non-families. 19.2% of all households were made up of individuals, and 10.5% had someone living alone who was 65 years of age or older. The average household size was 2.99, and the average family size was 3.46.

In the city, the population was spread out, with 31.7% under 18, 9.0% from 18 to 24, 24.0% from 25 to 44, 20.8% from 45 to 64, and 14.5% who were 65 years of age or older. The median age was 36 years. For every 100 females, there were 93.7 males. For every 100 females aged 18 and over, there were 89.9 males.

The median income for a household in the city was $41,618, and the median income for a family was $48,276. Males had a median income of $43,094 versus $25,871 for females. The per capita income for the city was $17,411. About 2.0% of families and 2.5% of the population were below the poverty line, including none of those under age 18 and 7.8% of those aged 65 or over.

Politics 
Farr West is located in Utah's 1st congressional district. In the 117th United States Congress, Blake Moore (R-Ogden) represents the district

See also

 List of cities and towns in Utah

References

External links

 

Cities in Utah
Cities in Weber County, Utah
Ogden–Clearfield metropolitan area
Populated places established in 1858
1858 establishments in Utah Territory